Richard Norris may refer to:

Richard Norris (1807–1874), American locomotive engineer with Norris Locomotive Works
Richard Norris (actor) (1910–1943), American actor, killed during World War II
Richard Norris (1922–2005), American actor, starred in Abie's Irish Rose
Richard Norris (field hockey) (1931–2012), British Olympic field hockey player
Richard Norris (musician) (born 1965), British music producer and musician, with The Grid
Richard Hill Norris (1830–1916), British physiologist, spiritualist and photographer
Richard A. Norris, Jr. (1930–2005), Episcopal priest, theologian and patristics scholar

See also
Dick Norris, Australian entomologist